That's All! is a 1967 live album by Sammy Davis Jr., recorded at the Sands Hotel on the Las Vegas Strip.

Track listing
 "Ain't I" (George Rhodes) – 1:02
 "With a Song in My Heart" (Lorenz Hart, Richard Rodgers) – 2:05
 "Another Spring" (Robin Beaumont, Leslie Bricusse) – 2:57
 "Any Place I Hang My Hat Is Home" (Harold Arlen, Johnny Mercer) – 4:14
 "Rock-a-Bye Your Baby with a Dixie Melody" (Sam M. Lewis, Jean Schwartz, Joe Young) – 10:22
 Comedy Monologue by Sammy Davis, Jr. – 9:52
 Medley – 10:43 
 "I've Got You Under My Skin" (Cole Porter)
"What's a Nice Kid Like You Doing In a Place Like This?" (Bill Dana)
"Dang Me" (Roger Miller)
"Big Bad John" (Dean Acuff, Roy Acuff)
"The Girl From Ipanema" (Vinicius de Moraes, Norman Gimbel, Antonio Carlos Jobim)
"Ugly Chilie" (Mercer)
"On the Road to Mandalay" (Oley Speaks, Rudyard Kipling)
"What'd I Say" (Ray Charles)
"Hello Dolly!" (Jerry Herman)
"I've Got You Under My Skin" (Porter)
 "The Lady is a Tramp" (Hart, Rodgers) – 4:37
 Medley – 6:48
 "The Lonesome Road" (Gene Austin, Nathaniel Shilkret)
 "Gonna Build a Mountain" (Anthony Newley, Leslie Bricusse)
 "Yes I Can" (Lee Adams, Charles Strouse)
 "I Want to Be with You" (Adams, Strouse) 
 "Too Close for Comfort" (Jerry Bock, George David Weiss, Larry Holofcener)
 "Something's Gotta Give" (Mercer)
 "Hey There" (Richard Adler, Jerry Ross)
 "My Mother the Car" (Paul Hampton) – 2:23
 "On a Clear Day You Can See Forever" (Burton Lane, Alan Jay Lerner) – 2:45
 "The Birth of the Blues" (Lew Brown, Buddy DeSylva, Ray Henderson) – 4:13
 "As Long as She Needs Me" (Lionel Bart) – 2:31
 "Bye Bye Blackbird" (Mort Dixon, Henderson) – 3:14
 "One for My Baby (and One More for the Road)" (Arlen, Mercer) – 10:20
 "Where or When" (Hart, Rodgers) – 3:15
 "Chicago" (Fred Fisher) – 2:44
 "You're Nobody till Somebody Loves You" (James Cavanaugh, Russ Morgan, Larry Stock) – 3:23
 "Without a Song" (Edward Eliscu, Billy Rose, Vincent Youmans) – 3:43
 "What Kind of Fool Am I?" (Bricusse, Newley) – 3:11
 "Let's Keep Swinging" (Rhodes) – 8:11
 "Sweet Beginning" (Bricusse, Newley) – 1:42

Personnel 
Recorded in December 1966, The Copa Room at the Sands Hotel, Las Vegas:

Tracks 1-10

 Sammy Davis Jr.: vocals
 Buddy Rich: drums
 Michael Silver
 George Rhodes: conductor, arranger

References

Sammy Davis Jr. live albums
Albums produced by Jimmy Bowen
1967 live albums
Reprise Records live albums
Albums recorded at the Sands Hotel